Hungappa is a student newspaper published at Charles Sturt University in Wagga Wagga, Australia. The magazine, established in 1989, was produced by Rivcoll Union Inc, and is now managed by the Rivcoll Student Representative Committee. The current editors appointed by the SRC's elected committee are Ash Castles and Victoria Lee.

History 
Charles Sturt University was formed from the merger of a number of higher education campuses in the city of Wagga Wagga. Hungappa was first published on the Wagga Wagga campus of the University in 1989 with its name meaning "to spread the word" in the local Aboriginal tribe, the Wiradjuri's language.

The new and re-vamped "Hungappa" was the brainchild of Anita Craw, who developed a weekly black and white A4 newsletter entitled "RU News". [RU standing for Rivcoll Union] The newsletter was originally intended to spread sporting results and club activities and events to the members of the Rivcoll Union and its members - who were, by virtue of universal student unionism, the students of Charles Sturt University, Wagga Campus. However in 2003, the growing popularity of a column titled "Bar Fly" allowed the newsletter to flourish as a popular weekly publication throughout the campus.

At this stage, "Hungappa" was a glossy publication compiled approximately each semester as a collation of the union (and hence students') activities throughout the semester. Towards the end of Anita's term as editor, the decision was made to merge the Hungappa with the RU News. This decision was implemented shortly after her term as editor. 

As the job of editor fell to the Vice President of Rivcoll Student Association, Stephen Boxwell assumed the position of editor in 2004. He changed the face of Hungappa to an A3 size proof (folded through the middle) with articles and club reports that was typically around 20 A4 size pages in length. The weekly print run was approximately 300 with an estimated read-on rate of 4-5 readers per copy. Stephen, in changing the face of the publication, also changed the name to "Graphorrhea" after holding a naming competition. Sharron Sharrock worked in the role of layout and graphics for the publication. At the end of 2004, the decision was made to revert to the name "Hungappa" for the weekly publication.

In 2007, Hungappa went online with its own website and two 'baby' publications began production: the 'Ressies Hungappa' (for residential students of CSU Wagga) and 'The DEN', for the Distance Education students of CSU. 

In 2011, the paper developed a design focus, transitioning into a more professional product. New regular features were added such as "News Review" and "Fungappa". The second phase of the 2011 redesign included rebranding Rivcoll SRC, relaunching rivcoll.com, and introducing new mobile apps. The notion of having feature articles written specifically for the paper was also developed and encouraged with changes to the Rivcoll Publications Policy to benefit writers of articles.

Year 2016 sees a new look for the Hungappa. Graphics are done by O'Malley designs and a new team of illustrators has been hired. The paper also takes a radical shift in content, focusing more on student issues and creating an opportunity where students can enthusiastically create ideas and express them for a relatable audience. This noteworthy transformation has been accredited to the political ideologies of the pragmatic and controversial new editor in chief, Ash Castles.

References

External links 
 Rivcoll SRC website

Student newspapers published in Australia
Magazines established in 1989